Pubic ramus can refer to:
 Superior pubic ramus 
 Inferior pubic ramus